Electric power systems consist of generation plants of different energy sources, transmission networks, and distribution lines. Each of these components can have environmental impacts at multiple stages of their development and use including in their construction, during the generation of electricity, and in their decommissioning and disposal. These impacts can be split into operational impacts (fuel sourcing, global atmospheric and localized pollution) and construction impacts (manufacturing, installation, decommissioning, and disposal). All forms of electricity generation have some form of environmental impact, but coal-fired power is the dirtiest. This page is organized by energy source and includes impacts such as water usage, emissions, local pollution, and wildlife displacement.

Greenhouse gas emissions

Water usage

Water usage is one of the main environmental impacts of electricity generation. All thermal power plants (coal, natural gas, nuclear, geothermal, and biomass) use water as a cooling fluid to drive the thermodynamic cycles that allow electricity to be extracted from heat energy. Solar uses water for cleaning equipment, while hydroelectricity has water usage from evaporation from the reservoirs. The amount of water usage is often of great concern for electricity generating systems as populations increase and droughts become a concern. In addition, changes in water resources may impact the reliability of electricity generation. 

Discussions of water usage of electricity generation distinguish between water withdrawal and water consumption. According to the United States Geological Survey, "withdrawal" is defined as the amount of water removed from the ground or diverted from a water source for use, while "consumption" refers to the amount of water that is evaporated, transpired, incorporated into products or crops, or otherwise removed from the immediate water environment. Both water withdrawal and consumption are important environmental impacts to evaluate.

General numbers for fresh water usage of different power sources are shown below.

Steam-cycle plants (nuclear, coal, NG, solar thermal) require a great deal of water for cooling, to remove the heat at the steam condensers. The amount of water needed relative to plant output will be reduced with increasing boiler temperatures. Coal- and gas-fired boilers can produce high steam temperatures and so are more efficient, and require less cooling water relative to output. Nuclear boilers are limited in steam temperature by material constraints, and solar thermal is limited by concentration of the energy source.

Thermal cycle plants near the ocean have the option of using seawater. Such a site will not have cooling towers and will be much less limited by environmental concerns of the discharge temperature since dumping heat will have very little effect on water temperatures. This will also not deplete the water available for other uses.  Nuclear power in Japan for instance, uses no cooling towers at all because all plants are located on the coast. If dry cooling systems are used, significant water from the water table will not be used. Other, more novel, cooling solutions exist, such as sewage cooling at the Palo Verde Nuclear Generating Station.

Hydroelectricity's main cause of water usage is both evaporation and seepage into the water table.

Fossil fuels

Most electricity today is generated by burning fossil fuels and producing steam which is then used to drive a steam turbine that, in turn, drives an electrical generator.

More serious are concerns about the emissions that result from fossil fuel burning. Fossil fuels constitute a significant repository of carbon buried deep underground. Burning them results in the conversion of this carbon to carbon dioxide, which is then released into the atmosphere. The estimated  emission from the world's electrical power industry is 10 billion tonnes yearly. This results in an increase in the Earth's levels of atmospheric carbon dioxide, which enhances the greenhouse effect and contributes to global warming.

Coal power 
Depending on the particular fossil fuel and the method of burning, other emissions may be produced as well.  Ozone, sulfur dioxide, NO2 and other gases are often released, as well as particulate matter. Sulfur and nitrogen oxides contribute to smog and acid rain. In the past, plant owners addressed this problem by building very tall flue-gas stacks, so that the pollutants would be diluted in the atmosphere. While this helps reduce local contamination, it does not help at all with global issues.

Fossil fuels, particularly coal, also contain dilute radioactive material, and burning them in very large quantities releases this material into the environment, leading to low levels of local and global radioactive contamination, the levels of which are, ironically, higher than a nuclear power station as their radioactive contaminants are controlled and stored.

Coal also contains traces of toxic heavy elements such as mercury, arsenic and others. Mercury vaporized in a power plant's boiler may stay suspended in the atmosphere and circulate around the world. While a substantial inventory of mercury exists in the environment, as other man-made emissions of mercury become better controlled, power plant emissions become a significant fraction of the remaining emissions. Power plant emissions of mercury in the United States are thought to be about 50 tons per year in 2003, and several hundred tons per year in China. Power plant designers can fit equipment to power stations to reduce emissions.

Coal mining practices in the United States have also included strip mining and removing mountain tops. Mill tailings are left out bare and have been leached into local rivers and resulted in most or all of the rivers in coal producing areas to run red year round with sulfuric acid that kills all life in the rivers.

Fossil gas power 
In 2022 the IEA said that greenhouse gas emissions from gas-fired power plants had increased by nearly 3% the previous year and that more efforts were needed to reduce them.

As well as greenhouse gases, these power plants emit nitrogen oxides (NOx) but this is less dangerous than NOx from gas appliances in houses.

The efficiency of gas-fired power plants can be improved by co-generation and geothermal (combined heat and power) methods. Process steam can be extracted from steam turbines. Waste heat produced by thermal generating stations can be used for space heating of nearby buildings. By combining electric power production and heating, less fuel is consumed, thereby reducing the environmental effects compared with separate heat and power systems.

Fuel oil and diesel 
Dirty oil is burnt in power plants in a few oil producing countries such as Iran. Diesel is often used in backup generators, which can cause air pollution.

Switching from fuels to electricity

Nuclear power

Renewable energy
Renewable power technologies can have significant environmental benefits.

Both solar and wind have been criticized from an aesthetic point of view. However, methods and opportunities exist to deploy these renewable technologies efficiently and unobtrusively: fixed solar collectors can double as noise barriers along highways, and extensive roadway, parking lot, and roof-top area is currently available; amorphous photovoltaic cells can also be used to tint windows and produce energy.

Hydroelectricity 

The major advantage of conventional hydroelectric dams with reservoirs is their ability to store potential power for later electrical production. The combination of a natural supply of energy and production on demand has made hydro power the largest source of renewable energy by far. Other advantages include longer life than fuel-fired generation, low operating costs, and the provision of facilities for water sports.  Some dams also operate as pumped-storage plants balancing supply and demand in the generation system. Overall, hydroelectric power can be less expensive than electricity generated from fossil fuels or nuclear energy, and areas with abundant hydroelectric power attract industry.

However, in addition to the advantages above, there are several disadvantages to dams that create large reservoirs.  These may include: dislocation of people living where the reservoirs are planned, release of significant amounts of carbon dioxide at construction and flooding of the reservoir, disruption of aquatic ecosystems and bird life, adverse impacts on the river environment, and in rare cases catastrophic failure of the dam wall.

Some dams only generate power and serve no other purpose, but in many places large reservoirs are needed for flood control and/or irrigation, adding a hydroelectric portion is a common way to pay for a new reservoir. Flood control protects life/property and irrigation supports increased agriculture. 

Small hydro and run-of-the-river are two low impact alternatives to hydroelectric reservoirs, although they may produce intermittent power due to a lack of stored water.

Tidal

Biomass

Electrical power can be generated by burning anything which will combust. Some electrical power is generated by burning crops which are grown specifically for the purpose. Usually this is done by fermenting plant matter to produce ethanol, which is then burned. This may also be done by allowing organic matter to decay, producing biogas, which is then burned. Also, when burned, wood is a form of biomass fuel.

Burning biomass produces many of the same emissions as burning fossil fuels. However, growing biomass captures carbon dioxide out of the air, so that the net contribution to global atmospheric carbon dioxide levels is small.

The process of growing biomass is subject to the same environmental concerns as any kind of agriculture. It uses a large amount of land, and fertilizers and pesticides may be necessary for cost-effective growth. Biomass that is produced as a by-product of agriculture shows some promise, but most such biomass is currently being used, for plowing back into the soil as fertilizer if nothing else.

Wind power

Geothermal power

Geothermal energy is the heat of the Earth, which can be tapped into to produce electricity in power plants. Warm water produced from geothermal sources can be used for industry, agriculture, bathing and cleansing. Where underground steam sources can be tapped, the steam is used to run a steam turbine. Geothermal steam sources have a finite life as underground water is depleted. Arrangements that circulate surface water through rock formations to produce hot water or steam are, on a human-relevant time scale, renewable.

While a geothermal power plant does not burn any fuel, it will still have emissions due to substances other than steam which come up from the geothermal wells. These may include hydrogen sulfide, and carbon dioxide. Some geothermal steam sources entrain non-soluble minerals that must be removed from the steam before it is used for generation; this material must be properly disposed. Any (closed cycle) steam power plant requires cooling water for condensers; diversion of cooling water from natural sources, and its increased temperature when returned to streams or lakes, may have a significant impact on local ecosystems.

Removal of ground water and accelerated cooling of rock formations can cause earth tremors. Enhanced geothermal systems (EGS) fracture underground rock to produce more steam; such projects can cause earthquakes. Certain geothermal projects (such as one near Basel, Switzerland in 2006) have been suspended or canceled owing to objectionable seismicity induced by geothermal recovery. However, risks associated with "hydrofracturing induced seismicity are low compared to that of natural earthquakes, and can be reduced by careful management and monitoring" and "should not be regarded as an impediment to further development of the Hot Rock geothermal energy resource".

Solar power

See also

Air pollution
Alta controversy
The Carbon Principles
Cost of electricity by source – includes environmental and health costs
EKOenergy – ecolabel for electricity managed by environmental NGOs
Environmental impact of the energy industry
Eugene Green Energy Standard
Flue-gas desulfurization
Flue-gas emissions from fossil-fuel combustion
Fossil-fuel power plant
Life-cycle greenhouse-gas emissions of energy sources
List of countries by electricity production from renewable source
List of energy storage projects
Nuclear power
Nuclear whistleblowers
Power stations
Scientific opinion on climate change

References

Works cited

External links
Who's Afraid Of Nuclear Power? – ABC Australia – 4 Corners – International Nuclear Energy Policy Histories, Trends & Debates

Renewable energy policy
Landscape
Power stations
Electricity generation